Kuehneola uredinis is a plant pathogen. Kuehneola uredinis is a fungal pathogen that causes cane and leaf rust only in Rubus cultivars or wild and ornamental blackberry species.

References

External links
 USDA ARS Fungal Database

Pucciniales
Fungal plant pathogens and diseases
Fungi described in 1824
Galls
Taxa named by Johann Heinrich Friedrich Link